Ned Hanigan (born 11 April 1995) is an Australian professional rugby union player who currently plays for the  in the Super Rugby competition and the Australian Wallabies. His preferred positions are blindside flanker or lock.

Early life and career
Hanigan was born in Dubbo and raised in Coonamble in the central-west part of New South Wales. After high school, he began studying science at University of New South Wales alongside Shute Shield rugby with Randwick, winning Premiership Rugby title with their Colts side before progressing on to their first team. During this time, he also represented New South Wales at Under-20 level in 2014 and 2015 and played for the New South Wales Country Eagles during the 2015 National Rugby Championship.

Professional career
Hanigan trained with the Waratahs wider training group in 2015 and then made the full squad ahead of the 2016 Super Rugby season. As a youngster competing against Wallaby internationals such as Dean Mumm, Will Skelton and Dave Dennis for a starting place, Hanigan's game time was limited to just 3 substitute appearances in his debut season.

International
Hanigan represented Australia at schoolboy level and was an important member of the side on their grand-slam European tour in 2013. He was also a member of the Australia Under-20 which competed at the 2015 World Rugby Under 20 Championship in Italy after which he was named his side's MVP for the tournament. Hanigan made his debut for the Australian Wallabies in 2017 against Fiji.

Super Rugby statistics

References

External links
 

1995 births
Living people
Australian rugby union players
Australia international rugby union players
Rugby union locks
New South Wales Waratahs players
New South Wales Country Eagles players
People educated at St Joseph's College, Hunters Hill
Rugby union flankers
Kurita Water Gush Akishima players
Rugby union players from New South Wales